Bothriomyrmex turcomenicus is a species of ant in the genus Bothriomyrmex. Described by Emery in 1925, the species is endemic to Kazakhstan, Turkey and Turkmenistan.

References

Bothriomyrmex
Hymenoptera of Asia
Insects of Central Asia
Insects of Turkey
Insects described in 1925